Alvin Chau (born April 9, 1989) is a Canadian former competitive ice dancer. He teamed up with Olivia Nicole Martins in April 2006. Together, they are the 2010 Canadian junior silver medalists and placed 13th at the 2010 World Junior Championships.

Programs 
(with Martins)

Results

With Martins

With Pelfier

References

External links 
 

Canadian male ice dancers
1989 births
Living people
Figure skaters from Toronto
21st-century Canadian people